Joseph Cudjoe may refer to:
 Joseph Cudjoe (footballer)
 Joseph Cudjoe (politician)